Brush Creek is a stream in Clark County in the U.S. state of Missouri. It is a tributary of the Fox River.

Brush Creek was so named on account of thick brush along its course.

See also
List of rivers of Missouri

References

Rivers of Clark County, Missouri
Rivers of Missouri